Ink is the sixth studio album by British new wave band the Fixx, released in 1991.

The single, "How Much Is Enough?", reached No. 11 on the Billboard Mainstream Rock Tracks chart and No. 10 on the Modern Rock Tracks chart.

Track listing
All lyrics written by Cy Curnin except where noted; all music composed by Curnin, West-Oram, Woods, Greenall and Brown except where noted.
"All Is Fair"
"How Much Is Enough?" (Music: Curnin/West-Oram/Woods/Greenall/Brown/Hall/Cutler)
"No One Has to Cry" (Music: Curnin/West-Oram/Woods/Greenall/Brown/Cutler)
"Crucified" (Music: Curnin/West-Oram/Woods/Greenall/Brown/Cutler)
"Falling in Love" (Lyrics: Champlin, Music:Gaitsch/Champlin)
"Shut It Out"
"Still Around"
"All the Best Things" (Music: Curnin/West-Oram/Woods/Greenall/Brown/Sturkin/Rogers)
"Yesterday, Today" (Lyrics: Woods, Music: Curnin/West-Oram/Woods/Greenall/Brown)
"One Jungle" (Lyrics: Jeannette Obstoj)
"Climb the Hill" (Lyrics: Woods)
"Make No Plans" (Music: Curnin/West-Oram/Woods/Greenall/Brown/Termini)
"Ships Are Safe In Harbour" [*]
* bonus track on Japan CD issue

Personnel
Cy Curnin - vocals
Adam Woods - drums, vocals on "Climb the Hill"
Rupert Greenall - keyboards
Jamie West-Oram - guitar
Dan K. Brown - bass

Additional personnel
Rusty Anderson - guitar
Steven MacKinnon - keyboards
Richard Termini - piano, synthesizer

Production
Producers: Scott Cutler, Bruce Gaitsch, Rupert Hine, William Wittman
Executive producer: Randy Nicklaus
Engineers: John Agnello, Bruce Gaitsch, Rupert Hine, Dennis McCay, Stephen W. Tayler
Assistant engineers: Matt Howe, Fred Kelly, Ed Korengo, Duane Sexton
Mixing: John Agnello, Matt Howe 
Mastering: Steve Hall
Drum programming: Steve Dubin
Production coordination: Steve Barri, Randy Nicklaus, Mark Sullivan

Charts

Singles

References 

The Fixx albums
1991 albums
Albums produced by Rupert Hine
MCA Records albums